The Trump wall, commonly referred to as "The Wall", is an expansion of the Mexico–United States barrier that started during the U.S. presidency of Donald Trump and was a critical part of Trump's campaign platform in the 2016 presidential election. Throughout his 2016 presidential campaign, Trump called for the construction of a border wall. He said that, if elected, he would "build the wall and make Mexico pay for it". Then-Mexican president Enrique Peña Nieto rejected Trump's claim that Mexico would pay for the wall; all construction in fact relied exclusively on U.S. funding.

In January 2017, Trump signed Executive Order 13767, which formally directed the U.S. government to begin wall construction along the U.S.–Mexico border using existing federal funding. After a political struggle for funding, including an appropriations lapse resulting in a government shutdown for 35 days, and the declaration of a national emergency, construction started in 2018.

The U.S. built new barriers along ,  of which previously had no barrier. Much of the remainder consists of  steel bollard wall where previously there had been fencing or vehicle barriers. Additionally, a private organization called We Build the Wall constructed under  of new wall on private property near El Paso, Texas. By August 2020, the portions constructed by the organization were already in serious danger of collapsing due to erosion, and the acting U.S. attorney for the Southern District of New York unsealed an indictment charging four people, including former Trump chief strategist Steve Bannon, with a scheme to defraud hundreds of thousands of donors by illegally taking funds intended to finance construction for personal use. An unpublished memo from the U.S. Customs and Border Protection leaked in March 2022 revealed that the "impenetrable" border wall had been breached more than 3,200 times by the time Trump left office in 2021.

Initially, on January 20, 2021, newly inaugurated U.S. president Joe Biden terminated the national emergency and halted construction of the wall, but the U.S. Secretary of Homeland Security later hinted that the construction of the wall may continue under Biden's administration. In April 2021, the Biden administration cancelled all border wall projects that were being paid for with funds diverted from U.S. Department of Defense accounts. By October 2021, several border wall construction contracts have been cancelled and, in some cases, land that was acquired by the government from private property owners via eminent domain, were returned to their owners. On July 28, 2022, the Biden administration announced it would fill four wide gaps in Arizona near Yuma, an area with some of the busiest corridors for illegal crossings.

Background

The Mexico–United States barrier is a series of vertical barriers along the Mexico–United States border aimed at preventing illegal crossings from Mexico into the United States. The barrier is not one contiguous structure, but a discontinuous series of physical obstructions variously classified as "fences" or "walls".

Between the physical barriers, security is provided by a "virtual fence" of sensors, cameras, and other surveillance equipment used to dispatch United States Border Patrol agents to suspected migrant crossings.

The concept for the proposed expansion was developed by campaign advisers Sam Nunberg and Roger Stone in 2014 as a memorable talking point Trump could use to tie his business experience as a builder and developer to his immigration policy proposals. The idea for the wall was first aired publicly in January 2015 at the Iowa Freedom Summit hosted by Citizens United and Steve King. Trump proposed it again at Trump's June 2015 announcement speech for his 2015–2016 presidential campaign, along with a claim that Mexico would pay for it. Trump has repeated the claim many times.

Structure

In February 2017, Trump said "the wall is getting designed right here" but did not offer specifics. In March 2017, U.S. Customs and Border Protection (CBP) began accepting prototype ideas for a U.S.–Mexico border wall from companies and said it would issue a request for proposals by March 24.

In June 2017, Trump said his proposed border wall should be covered with solar panels as a means of making "beautiful structures" and helping pay for the wall. This suggestion was criticized by some as illogical or impracticable; Albert Pope of the Rice University School of Architecture of Houston, Texas, noted that solar farms cannot be efficiently dispersed along a wall. Others, including John Griese, co-owner of the solar installation firm Elemental Energy, estimated a profit of over $100 million per year from such panels. In July, Trump said the wall should be transparent to detect smugglers who "throw the large sacks of drugs over".

The Associated Press reported that more than two hundred organizations had expressed interest in designing and building the wall for CBP. By April 2017, several companies had released their proposed designs to the public; CBP does not publicly release bids, and intends to name only the winning bid. The proposals included placing solar panels along part of a wall; placing artwork along the wall ("a polished concrete wall augmented with stones and artifacts" related to the local region); incorporating ballistics resistance technology and sensors for above ground and below ground penetration; and the creation of a "co-nation" where the border is maintained by both countries in an open status.

In September 2017, the U.S. government announced the start of construction of eight prototype barriers made from concrete and other materials. On June 3, 2018, the San Diego section of wall construction began. On October 26, a  stretch of steel bollards in Calexico, California, was commemorated as the first section of Trump's wall, although media coverage heavily debated whether it should be considered a "wall" or a "fence". Trump scheduled a visit to this section in April 2019.

A manufacturing company based in Pine City, Minnesota, was awarded a bid to help build the "virtual wall" along the border in 2018. Instead of using physical walls, this plan for a "virtual wall" would involve easily transportable "roll-up" towers with attached motion sensing and camera equipment. While initially small and mobile, when deployed the internal structure of the tower telescopes upwards to create a tall surveillance apparatus. Along remote parts of the border, this method could be cheaper and more practical than building permanent structures on location.

Trump requested that the wall be painted black, despite the protests of military leaders and border officials, who called it unnecessary. Trump felt that the dark color would be more forbidding, and make the steel too hot to touch during the summer. Painting the wall was expected to cost between $500 million and $3 billion.

Cost estimates

Early estimates
In 2013, a Bloomberg Government analysis estimated that it would cost up to $28 billion annually to seal the border. While campaigning for the presidency in early 2016, Trump claimed it would be a one-time cost of only $8 billion, while Republican House Speaker Paul Ryan and Senate Majority Leader Mitch McConnell said $15 billion, and the Trump administration's own early estimates ranged up to $25 billion. The Department of Homeland Security's internal estimate in early 2017, shortly after Trump took office, was that his proposed border wall would cost $21.6 billion and take 3.5 years to build.

Considerations
One-time costs include land acquisition and construction of new or replacement fence; ongoing costs include maintenance of existing fence and Border Patrol agents who guard the area. Rough and remote terrain on many parts of the border, such as deserts and mountains, would make construction and maintenance of a wall expensive. On federally protected wilderness areas and Native American reservations, the Department of Homeland Security (DHS) may have only limited construction authority, and a wall could cause environmental damage.

Outcome
As of December 2020, the total funding given for new fencing was about $15 billion, a third of which had been given by Congress while Trump had ordered the rest taken from the military budget.

A March 2021 review of the Trump work on the wall found only  of new barriers where none had previously existed. While Trump had described the new wall as "virtually impenetrable", it was found that smugglers had repeatedly sawed through the wall with cheap power tools. Also, new dirt roads that had been used to access the wall construction served as new access roads for smugglers.

Effectiveness
Different sources draw different conclusions about the actual or likely effectiveness of the wall. Research at Texas A&M University and Texas Tech University indicated that the wall, and border walls in general, are unlikely to be effective at reducing illegal immigration or movement of contraband. By contrast, the American Economic Journal found that wall construction caused a 15–35 percent reduction in migration, varying with proximity to the barrier.

Critics of Trump's plan note that expanding the wall would not stop the routine misuse of legal ports of entry by people smuggling contraband, overstaying travel visas, using fraudulent documents, or stowing away. They also point out that in addition to the misuse of ports of entry, even a border-wide wall could be bypassed by tunneling (compare the borders of the Gaza Strip), climbing, or by using boats or aircraft. Additionally, along some parts of the border, the existing rough terrain may be a greater deterrent than a wall. Trump reportedly suggested fortifying the wall with a water-filled trench inhabited by snakes or alligators, and electric fencing topped with spikes that can pierce human flesh.

The U.S. Customs and Border Protection agency has frequently called for more physical barriers, citing their efficacy. "I started in the San Diego sector in 1992 and it didn't matter how many agents we lined up," said Chief Patrol Agent Rodney Scott. "We could not make a measurable impact on the flow [of undocumented immigrants] across the border. It wasn't until we installed barriers along the border that gave us the upper hand that we started to get control." I have been in locations where there was no barrier, and then I was there when we put it up. It certainly helps. It's not a be all end all. It's a part of a system. We need the technology, we need that infrastructure".

Over the wall's first three years, Mexican smugglers sawed through the wall multiple times per day, usually with ordinary power tools, according to maintenance records from U.S. Customs and Border Protection. The Washington Post reported "891 breaches during fiscal 2019, 906 during fiscal 2020 and 1,475 during fiscal 2021." The government patched these holes, spending approximately $800 per incident and often leaving visible evidence of the repair. One early report of this damage was in November 2019. People were sawing through steel bollards in areas where sensors to detect such breaches had not yet been installed. Though Trump claimed it was "very easily fixed" by "put[ting] the chunk back in", border agents argued that smugglers tend to return to previously sawed wall because the bollards are weakened.

In January 2020, a few wall panels under construction in Calexico, California, were blown over by strong Santa Ana winds before the poured concrete foundations cured. There was no other property damage or injuries as a result of the incident.

In October 2020, the DHS published data indicating that the new border barrier has been effective at reducing the number of illegal border entries. The barrier also reduced ongoing manpower costs in at least one area in which it had been built.

Funding plans and actions

Campaign promise (2016)

Throughout his 2015–2016 presidential campaign, Donald Trump called for construction of a large fortified border wall, claiming that if elected he would "build the wall and make Mexico pay for it". Even before declaring his candidacy he declared he wanted "nothing to do with Mexico other than to build an impenetrable WALL". In his June 2015 announcement of his candidacy he promised "I would build a great wall, and no one builds walls better than me, believe me, and I'll build them very inexpensively. I will build a great wall and I'll have Mexico pay for that wall." After taking office he suggested a "steel wall with openings" so border agents could see through it; starting in 2018 he referred to it as a "steel slat barrier".

Trump repeatedly said Mexico will pay for the construction of the border wall, but he did not explain how the U.S. government would compel Mexico to do so. Trump said, "there will be a payment; it will be in a form, perhaps a complicated form". The Mexican government has rejected Trump's statements and has rejected the idea of Mexico funding construction of a wall.

Upon taking office Trump signed an executive order to begin building the wall, but left open the question of payment. The Trump administration suggested that wall construction could be funded by a twenty percent tariff on Mexico imports, a proposal which immediately encountered objections from members of Congress of both parties. After the negative response, White House Chief of Staff Reince Priebus indicated that the administration was considering "a buffet of options" for funding a wall. In April 2016, Trump said he would "compel Mexico to pay for a border wall by blocking remittances and canceling visas unless Mexico makes a one-time payment of $5 billion to $10 billion to the U.S." Money wiring service companies have identified a number of legal, economic, and practical obstacles to such a proposal, saying it would be impossible to track all money transfers between Mexico and the United States, or to effectively block all remittances. Some economists argue that blocking remittances could harm the U.S. economy. Brookings Institution fellow Aaron Klein said a move to block remittances would be a reversal of the existing U.S. policy "to encourage the flow of money to come into the official system and to discourage the flow of funds through the underground network".

Executive Order (2017)

On January 25, 2017, Trump signed Executive Order 13767, which formally directed the government to begin attempting to construct a border wall using existing federal funding, although actual construction of a wall did not begin at this time due to the large expense and lack of clarity on how it would be paid for.

Trump had planned to meet Peña Nieto at the White House on January 27, 2017, to discuss topics including border security and possible negotiations around the wall. However, the day before the meeting, Trump announced that the U.S. would impose a twenty percent tariff on imported Mexican goods as Mexico's payment for the wall. In response, Peña Nieto gave a national televised address saying Mexico would not pay for the wall and cancelled his meeting with Trump.

In March 2017, the Trump administration submitted an amendment for fiscal year 2017 that includes a $3 billion continuing budget for "border security and immigration enforcement". Trump's FY 2018 Budget Blueprint increases discretionary funds for the Department of Homeland Security (DHS) by $2.8 billion (to $44.1 billion). The DHS Secretary John F. Kelly told the Senate Homeland Security and Governmental Affairs Committee during a hearing the Budget Blueprint "includes $2.6 billion for high-priority border security technology and tactical infrastructure, including funding to plan, design and construct the border wall".

In July 2017, U.S. Representative Michael McCaul, Republican of Austin, Texas, the chairman of the House Homeland Security Committee, said the Republican-controlled U.S. House of Representatives would seek to pass a special supplemental appropriations bill to spend money on initial construction of the wall, a demand of the Trump administration. Such a supplemental spending bill was supported by then-House Speaker Paul Ryan. However, Senate Democrats expressed confidence that they can block an appropriations bill for wall construction, with the aid of some Republicans who also oppose the construction of a wall due to its enormous cost. Speaking at a Trump rally on August 22, 2017, Trump threatened to close down the government if Congress did not approve funding: "The obstructionist Democrats would like us not to do it, but believe me, if we have to close down our government, we're building that wall."

In August 2017, while speaking at a rally in Phoenix, Arizona, Trump said he would close down the U.S. government if necessary to force Congress to pay for the wall. He was harshly criticized by prominent leaders of his political base such as Ann Coulter and Rush Limbaugh for failing to secure $5 billion in funding for the wall in the previous fiscal year's appropriations bill.

Build the Wall, Enforce the Law Act introduced (2018)
A January 2018 Trump administration proposal for the U.S. Customs and Border Protection called for $18 billion in funding for the wall over the following ten years. While on the campaign trail in February 2016, Trump claimed the cost to be just $8 billion for the wall.

On March 13, 2018, Trump cited a study by the anti-immigration Center for Immigration Studies think tank, which claimed that a wall along the Mexican border could save taxpayers $64 billion by reducing the "crime and welfare costs" of undocumented immigrants in the ten years following its construction, thereby breaking even on construction costs and "paying for itself". Eric Boehm of Reason magazine disputed this claim, saying the study massively underestimated the actual cost of building and maintaining the wall. Boehm also criticized that the analysis overestimated the positive economic impact of stopping illegal immigration and how good the wall would be at preventing it, citing that a "third of all illegal immigrants" were simply overstaying their visa and had not actually entered the U.S. illegally. Ten days later, Trump signed the Consolidated Appropriations Act, 2018, a $1.3 trillion omnibus spending bill where Congress appropriated $1.6 billion of it towards the wall. He characterized it as a "down payment" that would be spent "building not only some new wall ... but also fixing existing walls". By May 2019,  of barrier had been constructed from the appropriation.

The Build the Wall, Enforce the Law Act of 2018 was introduced on October 12 by then-House Majority Leader Kevin McCarthy Estimated at $23.4 billion, the bill, along with the $1.6 billion from the $1.3 trillion spending bill, would have amounted to the $25 billion projected to complete the larger and fortified wall.

Government shutdown (2018–2019)

From December 22, 2018, to January 25, 2019, the federal government was partially shut down due to Trump's declared intention to veto any spending bill that did not include $5 billion in funding for a border wall. On January 4, 2019, Trump claimed that former presidents had privately told him they should have built a border wall, but every living former U.S. president denied this. In a televised speech on January 8, Trump asserted that ninety percent of the heroin sold in America "floods across from our southern border", although virtually all drugs smuggled across the border flow through legal ports of entry rather than through open border spaces. During a visit to McAllen, Texas, on January 10, Trump said Mexico would not directly pay for the wall, despite his having said so during the 2016 campaign: "When during the campaign, I would say 'Mexico is going to pay for it', obviously, I never said this, and I never meant they're gonna write out a check, I said they're going to pay for it. They are. Mexico is paying for the wall indirectly, and when I said Mexico will pay for the wall in front of thousands and thousands of people, obviously they're not gonna write a check. But they are paying for the wall indirectly many, many times over by the really great trade deal we just made." Media fact-checkers determined this assertion to be false.

On January 25, 2019, Trump agreed to endorse a stopgap bill to reopen the government, saying it was to allow for negotiations to take place to approve an appropriations bill both parties could agree on. He threatened to close the government again in three weeks if he was not satisfied with Congressional action. This 35-day government shutdown was the longest in U.S. history. The previous record was 21 days in 1995–1996.

Funding restrictions (2019)

In February 2019, Congress amended an existing appropriations bill, adding language that specifically prohibits new funding from being used to build border barriers at several sites, including the Santa Ana National Wildlife Refuge, the Bentsen-Rio Grande Valley State Park, the La Lomita Historical park, the National Butterfly Center, and the area "within or east of" the Vista del Mar Ranch tract of the Lower Rio Grande Valley National Wildlife Refuge. Soon afterwards, however, Trump declared a National Emergency Concerning the Southern Border of the United States, which the administration claimed invalidated the restrictions imposed by Congress.

The funding restrictions, and the National Emergency executive order, became the center points of the legal challenge to the appropriation of funds to construct the wall.

Declaration of national emergency (2019)

On February 15, 2019, Trump signed a bill to fund the government for the balance of the fiscal year, but derided the bill as inadequate because it contained only $1.375 billion for border security. Trump had earlier insisted he needed $5.7 billion to extend the Mexico–United States barrier. At the same time, Trump signed a declaration that the situation at the southern border constitutes a national emergency. This declaration ostensibly made available $600 million from the Treasury Forfeiture Fund, $2.5 billion from the U.S. Department of Defense (including anti-drug accounts), $3.6 billion from military construction accounts, for a total of $8 billion when added to the $1.375 billion allocated by Congress. However, a week after the bill was signed, it emerged that more than a third of those funds had already been spent for their original purposes, and were therefore unavailable.

On February 27, 2019, the House of Representatives voted in favor of a resolution rejecting Trump's declaration of a national emergency on the southern border. On March 14, the Senate did the same. The next day, Trump vetoed the bill. It was the first veto of his presidency. In September, the House and Senate again voted in favor of ending the declaration of emergency, and in October the president again vetoed it. The same month, a lawsuit filed in El Paso County produced a ruling that Trump's declaration of emergency was unlawful, as it fails to meet the National Emergencies Act's definition of an emergency.

Funding granted, setbacks, and progress (2019–2020)

In March 2019, the Pentagon issued a list of proposed military construction projects which could be postponed, under the president's emergency declaration, so that their funding could be used for the wall. The Pentagon authorized up to $1 billion to be transferred to the Army Corps of Engineers for the construction of additional barriers. In July, the five conservative justices on the Supreme Court achieved a majority to lift a May 2019 block placed by a lower federal court. Thus, the Supreme Court ruled to allow $2.5 billion of funds originally intended for Department of Defense anti-drug efforts to be reallocated to the wall. The American Civil Liberties Union challenged this ruling on behalf of environmental groups, but on July 31, 2020, the Supreme Court again ruled that the $2.5 billion could continue to be used to fund portions of the wall in Arizona, New Mexico, and California while legal proceedings continue. On August 7, the D.C. Circuit Court of Appeals ruled that House Democrats could proceed in a lawsuit against Trump's use of these funds.

In June 2019, Judge Trevor McFadden of the U.S. District Court for the District of Columbia ruled that the House lacked standing to block Trump's spending $6.1 billion in unappropriated funds on the wall; ten months later, he ruled that two environmental groups could continue pursuing their suits challenging the same funding. In July 2019, U.S. Customs and Border Protection said that although they had begun replacement fencing, no new walls had yet been built. On September 16, it was announced that multiple border wall projects had been halted because of depleted funds. Over  were planned to be built by the end of 2020, which would cost an estimated total of $18.4 billion. In September 2020, a three-judge panel of the DC Circuit Court of Appeals unanimously vacated the June 2019 district court dismissal for lack of jurisdiction, reinstating the House lawsuit. The judges wrote that the administration's effort to divert funds without congressional approval "turns the constitutional order upside down".

To fund 11 border barrier projects in Arizona, New Mexico, and Texas, the Pentagon will take funds from military construction projects in 23 states, three territories, and 19 countries, including schools and childcare centers for children of American soldiers. On December 10, a federal judge in Texas blocked the use of military funds for building the wall. Ten days later, Trump signed a spending bill with about $1.4 billion allotted for it. On January 8, 2020, a Fifth Circuit Court of Appeals granted a stay of the Texas judge's order, freeing the $3.6 billion for the wall. On February 13, the Pentagon notified Congress that it would divert $3.8 billion from funding for the military's anti-drug activities and the war on terror to building the wall. The Pentagon's plan for that round of wall funding would include money taken from: two F35 combat aircraft, eight Reaper drones, four C130 transport aircraft, two V22 Osprey tiltrotor aircraft, and also for amphibious ships, equipment for the National Guard, and trucks for the Army. As of March 2020, nineteen states were suing the administration on the basis that the reallocation of funds was unconstitutional. On June 26, the Ninth Circuit Court of Appeals ruled 2–1 that the use of military funding for the wall is unconstitutional. On July 14, 2020, the House approved a military spending bill which would prohibit defense funds from being reallocated to the wall.

On February 20, 2020, the U.S. Department of Homeland Security, waived, in accordance with section 102(c) of the Illegal Immigration Reform and Immigrant Responsibility Act of 1996, ten U.S. government procurement laws applicable to border wall construction in California, Arizona, New Mexico and Texas. Unlike prior waivers concerning environmental impact reviews under the presidencies of Trump and George W. Bush, this was the first to be used for procurement laws and regulations. On April 14, the Army Corps of Engineers announced that $569 million would be given to BFBC, an affiliate of Barnard Construction, to build  of wall in El Centro and San Diego, California. There was no competitive bidding process.

At the February 2020 Conservative Political Action Conference, Trump reiterated that Mexico would be paying for the wall. "Mexico is paying for it and it's every bitit's better than the wall that was projected."

Construction progressed during the final year of the Trump administration, including the filing of land condemnation actions in court and the issuing of waivers. Another six waivers of environmental laws were effectuated March 16, 2020, with potential consequences to the range of the jaguar. According to the Center for Biological Diversity's Laiken Jordahl, residents of border communities fear that the pandemic will worsen in their areas because of continued construction. Jordahl criticized this continuation because opponents of the wall cannot currently engage safely in public protest. On June 29, the Supreme Court declined to hear the center's case against the Trump administration's waivers of certain environmental laws in order to expedite the wall's construction.

U.S. Customs and Border Protection (CBP) confirmed that almost all of this was replacement fencing, but the fencing replaced was outdated or dilapidated.

Private effort

We Build the Wall, a private organization founded by military veteran Brian Kolfage, raised over $25 million beginning in 2018, with Trump's encouragement and with leadership from Kris Kobach and Steve Bannon. Over the 2019 Memorial Day weekend, the organization constructed a half-mile (0.8 km) "weathered steel" bollard fence near El Paso on private land adjoining the U.S.–Mexico border using $6–8 million of the donated funds. Kolfage's organization said it has plans to construct further barriers on private lands adjoining the border in Texas and California. On December 3, 2019, a Hidalgo County judge ordered the group to temporarily halt all construction due to its plans to build adjacent to the Rio Grande, which a lawyer for the National Butterfly Center argued would create a flooding risk. According to Kolfage,

The organization also ignored a request by the International Boundary and Water Commission to stop construction and submit engineering plans. On January 9, 2020, federal judge Randy Crane called the claims of both the International Boundary and Water Commission and the National Butterfly Center "highly speculative", allowing construction to continue.

In July 2020, privately funded wall associated with the organization was reported to be structurally eroding. Trump distanced himself from the group despite its having received $1.7 billion in contracts from his administration.

On August 20, 2020, Bannon was arrested and charged on two counts of fraud; he allegedly "defrauded hundreds of thousands of donors", funneling over $1 million from We Build the Wall through one of his own non-profits and using a significant portion of it for personal expenses and to pay Kolfage. Kolfage, financier Andrew Badolato, and Timothy Shea were also charged. Kolfage was accused of taking $350,000 for personal use; he allegedly discussed the scheme with Badolato. Some funds were allegedly funneled through a shell company controlled by Shea. Kolfage and Badolato pleaded guilty and await sentencing, Bannon secured from Trump a blanket pardon covering the allegations, and in the trial prosecuting Shea set for May 24, 2021, the jury deadlocked 11 to 1.

Presidential transition (2021)
By January 5, 2021, the U.S. had built new or replacement wall along .

On January 20, U.S. president Joe Biden signed Proclamation 10142, terminating the national emergency and pausing the construction of the wall. In a letter notifying Congress of the proclamation, Biden wrote that the declaration of a national emergency had been "unwarranted". Before taking office, Biden said he would not remove parts of the wall constructed during the Trump administration, but would protect the border instead with "high-tech capacity" at the "ports of entry". On April 30, the Department of Defense announced that it was canceling all border wall contracts using funding originally allocated for military purposes.

On April 13, Representative Madison Cawthorn introduced the "Donument Act" (which a spokesperson for Cawthorn explained was a portmanteau of the words "Donald" and "monument"), proposing to designate the unfinished wall and 300,000 surrounding acres as a national monument.

On June 11, the Pentagon announced that it would restore $2.2 billion in funding redirected to the wall back to military projects. 

In mid-2021, construction began on 13 miles of border wall in Hidalgo County, Texas. By October 2021, several border wall construction contracts had been cancelled and, in some cases, land that was acquired by the government from private property owners via eminent domain, was returned to their owners. On July 28, 2022, the Biden administration announced it would fill four wide gaps in Arizona near Yuma, an area with some of the busiest corridors for illegal crossings.

Impact

Economic
According to a 2020 study, the potential welfare benefits from constructing Trump's proposed border wall (if illegal immigration is reduced massively, with potential increases in the wages of local American low-skilled workers) are substantially smaller than the cost of constructing the wall.

Environment

The construction of a border wall, as envisioned in the order, could cause significant environmental damage, including habitat destruction and habitat fragmentation that would harm wildlife, including endangered species. Some of the species that may potentially be affected include bighorn sheep, black bears, and pygmy owls. A lawsuit arguing some of these points was brought forward by the National Butterfly Center, after employees discovered that parts of the planned wall would be built through the property. However, Judge Richard J. Leon dismissed the case against the Department of Homeland Security, leading the center to claim that they will refile or appeal the case.

A 2019 survey by the Center of Biological Diversity found the construction of the wall to be having a devastating impact on the ecosystem, with construction coming perilously close to the San Bernardino National Wildlife Refuge and an active migration corridor for the North American jaguar, as well as already damaging habitats in sites such as Slaughter Ranch. The survey also found unrestricted pumping of groundwater from local aquifers in order to produce concrete for the wall, which will have a destructive effect on subterranean ecosystems as well as surface ones that are sustained by groundwater. In mid-2020, the Defenders of Wildlife non-profit organization obtained a government report from June which found that a well used to make concrete for the wall "is significantly impacting wells located at San Bernardino National Wildlife Refuge", which according to the Defenders, explains "why some ponds at the Refuge are void of water, and why it is so difficult to maintain water levels at other ponds that currently have threatened and endangered fish species", including the Yaqui catfish. In 2021, an endangered Mexican gray wolf was stopped from crossing from New Mexico into Mexico by a section of border wall.

In December 2020, explosives and bulldozers were used inside Coronado National Memorial to clear a path to build the wall.

Organ Pipe Cactus National Monument
By October 2019, bulldozing began within the Organ Pipe Cactus National Monument, a Sonoran Desert ecological reserve created in 1976. The Corps of Engineers said it would relocate displaced cacti, although this appears to have not occurred in some cases. In February 2020, blasting began. The Organ Pipe monument includes 22 archaeological sites which host "unexcavated remnants of ancient Sonoran Desert peoples", some of which possibly date to 16,000 years ago. The Tohono O'odham Nation protested any new wall construction, as they have "historically lived in this area from time immemorial", according to the nation's chairman.

As of 2019, border patrol construction workers were coordinating with park officials to avoid causing damage.

Public acquisition of land
Additionally, privately owned land adjacent to the border would have to be acquired by the U.S. government to be built upon. Property owners in southern Texas will lose easy access to significant portions of their land as the wall is built along but some distance from the Rio Grande. Historic gravesites in South Texas may be impacted. In 2017, satirical party-game publisher Cards Against Humanity purchased a plot of land on the border to prevent the wall from being built there.

Opinions and responses

Domestic responses
Executive Order 13767 drew "furious condemnation" from some civil rights organizations and immigrant advocacy groups, who described the order as "meanspirited, counterproductive and costly and said the new policies would raise constitutional concerns while undermining the American tradition of welcoming people from around the world". Some religious personalities were also largely critical of the border-wall proposal. Hundreds of citizens gathered at Washington Square Park in New York City to protest the executive order.

In Congress, some Republicans praised Trump's executive order, such as U.S. Representative Lamar S. Smith of San Antonio, Texas, who said "he appreciated Trump 'honoring his commitment' on immigration", and Republican U.S. Senator Ron Johnson of Wisconsin, who said the wall would stop illegal immigration and compared it to the Israel–Egypt barrier. Other members of Congress from districts near the border were critical, such as Texans Will Hurd (Republican, San Antonio), Henry Cuellar (Democrat, Laredo), and Joaquin Castro (Democrat, San Antonio). Hurd criticized the order as "the most expensive and least effective way to secure the border" while Castro considered the wall "a lazy and ineffective strategy". Then-Senator Claire McCaskill (D-MO) said during a hearing that while she believed Americans want a secure border, she has "not met anyone [who] says the most effective way is to build a wall across the entirety of our southern border. The only one who keeps talking about that is President Trump."

Most members of the Southwest Border Sheriffs' Coalition, a group of sheriffs across the four states on the U.S.–Mexico border, are strongly opposed to the construction of a wall, citing its massive cost and logistical difficulties, and saying the wall would not be effective. Tony Estrada, a member of the Coalition and the longtime sheriff of the border county of Santa Cruz County, Arizona, has emerged as an outspoken critic of Trump's border wall proposal, saying the wall will not stymie drug cartel violence fueled by demand for drugs in the U.S. On the other hand, several Southwestern sheriffs praised and welcomed the proposal, and also activated a crowdfunding to support the construction. Then-sheriff Joe Arpaio of Maricopa County, Arizona, asked "what is wrong with a wall."

"Build the Wall"

"Build the Wall" is a political slogan that emerged from Trump's 2015–2016 presidential campaign.
Variant slogans include "Build a Wall" or "Build that Wall". It has inspired a number of counter-slogans among protesters of Trump policies, as well as parodies in popular culture, including memes. The slogan was not his official campaign slogan, which was "Make America Great Again".

The idea of the wall became popular enough among Trump's supporters that chants of "Build the Wall" became common at Trump rallies. After Trump won the 2016 election, reports emerged that the chant was being used by some children to bully their Latino classmates, and that the locations of these incidents were at least correlated with areas in which Trump received more votes.

Opinion surveys
A Rasmussen Reports poll from August 19, 2015, found that 51% supported building a wall on the border, while 37% opposed.

A February 2017 study conducted by the Pew Research Center found that "As was the case throughout the presidential campaign, more Americans continue to oppose (62%) than favor (35%) building a wall along the entire U.S. border with Mexico" (The Trump administration built border wall in some areas, however they did not pursue construction of border wall on the entirety of the U.S.-Mexico border). 43% of respondents thought a border wall would not have much impact on illegal immigration, while 54% thought it would have an impact (29% thought it would lead to a major reduction, 25% a minor reduction). 70% of Americans thought the U.S. would ultimately pay for the wall; 16% believed Mexico would pay for it. Public opinion was polarized by party: "About three-quarters (74%) of Republicans and Republican-leaning independents support a border wall, while an even greater share of Democrats and Democratic leaners express opposition to building a wall across the entire U.S.–Mexico border (89%)." Younger Americans and Americans with college degrees were more likely to oppose a wall than older Americans and those without college degrees.

In a separate January 2017 study conducted by the Pew Research Center, 39% of Americans identified construction of a U.S.–Mexico border wall as an "important goal for U.S. immigration policy". The survey found that while Americans were divided by party on many different immigration policies, "the widest [partisan split] by far is over building a southern border wall. Two-thirds of Republicans and Republican-leaning independents (67%) say construction of a wall on the U.S.–Mexico border is an important goal for immigration policy, compared with just 16 percent of Democrats and Democratic leaners."

A survey conducted by the National Border Patrol Council found that 89% of border patrol agents said a "wall system in strategic locations is necessary to securing the border". 7% of agents disagreed.

A poll conducted by CBS in June 21–22, 2018 found that 51% supported the border wall, while 48% opposed.

A poll conducted by the Senate Opportunity Fund in March 2021 found that 53% supported finishing construction of the border wall, while 38% opposed.

Impact on Mexico–U.S. relations

The executive order soured relations between the U.S. and Mexico. Mexican President Enrique Peña Nieto addressed Mexican citizens via a recorded message, in which he condemned Trump's executive order and again said Mexico would not pay for the wall's construction. Following a Twitter feud between the two leaders in which Trump threatened to cancel a planned meeting with Nieto in Washington, Nieto decided to cancel the meeting himself.

Addressing supporters, Mexican opposition politician Andrés Manuel López Obrador condemned the wall order as an insult to Mexico, and demanded the Mexican government to pursue claims against the American government in the United Nations.

In March 2017, Mexican congressman Braulio Guerra of Querétaro illegally climbed, and partially crossed, an existing  border fence on American soil dividing San Diego and Tijuana, saying that more walls would be ineffective.

The Roman Catholic Archbishop of Mexico opposed the border wall, and wrote that any Mexican company that participates in construction of the wall or supplies materials for construction would be committing "treason against the homeland".

Other international reactions
At the annual summit of the Community of Latin American and Caribbean States in January 2017, representatives from Latin American and Caribbean countries condemned the wall proposal.

Benjamin Netanyahu, the prime minister of Israel, applauded the plan, endorsing it as a "Great success. Great idea." Netanyahu declared "Trump is right" and likened the proposal to the Israeli West Bank barrier. After Mexican protests, the Prime Minister's office issued a statement saying that "[he] was addressing Israel's unique circumstances and the important experience we have and which we are willing to share with other nations. There was no attempt to voice an opinion regarding U.S.–Mexico ties."

Pope Francis has been critical of the project, saying in a March 2019 interview: "If you raise a wall between people, you end up a prisoner of that wall that you raised." He has made several references in speeches, and in a tweet, to building "bridges, not walls".

International reactions include artistic and intercultural facilitation devices. Projects have included exhibitions, signs, and demonstrations as well as physical adaptations promoting socialization such as a bright pink see-saw built through the wall that is accessible to people on both sides to enjoy together.

Associations' response
Many people "have voiced doubts about whether a wall would actually stem illegal immigration, or if it is worth the billions it is expected to cost". Critics have noted that the number of illegal immigrants in the U.S. had declined for several years before the order was signed, in part because of the Great Recession.

Gil Kerlikowske, the former Commissioner of the Customs and Border Protection, said the rugged terrain in the Arizona desert is one of many natural obstacles in the construction of the wall. Kerlikowske also said the border currently has  of fencing, and that the border is patrolled by various means, including by agents on motorcycles or ATVs and by drones. He said the current method was preferable to a wall.

After the executive order was signed, Jason Marczak of the Atlantic Council wrote: "Today's events are dangerous for the immediate and long-term security and economy of the United States. U.S.–Mexico cooperation is far-reaching: from intelligence sharing for the capture of drug traffickers to the flow of commercial goods that support the livelihoods of nearly five million American workers."

Legal aspects
On September 12, 2017, the United States Department of Homeland Security issued a notice that Acting Secretary of Homeland Security Elaine Duke would be waiving "certain laws, regulations and other legal requirements" to begin construction of the new wall near Calexico, California. The waiver allows the Department of Homeland Security to bypass the National Environmental Policy Act, the Endangered Species Act, the Clean Water Act, the Clean Air Act, the National Historic Preservation Act, the Migratory Bird Treaty Act, the Migratory Bird Conservation Act, the Archaeological Resources Protection Act, the Safe Drinking Water Act, the Noise Control Act, the Solid Waste Disposal Act, the Antiquities Act, the Federal Land Policy and Management Act, the Administrative Procedure Act, the Native American Graves Protection and Repatriation Act, and the American Indian Religious Freedom Act.

In 2020, two contractors who were employed by Sullivan Land Services Co. to provide security for wall construction filed a federal complaint alleging that the company and a subcontractor had performed illegal acts such as hiring undocumented workers, going "so far as to build a dirt road to expedite illegal border crossings to sites in San Diego, using construction vehicles to block security cameras", which was approved by an "unnamed supervisor at the Army Corps of Engineers".

Appropriations challenge

Following Trump's executive order to proceed with the wall's construction in February 2019, two separate cases were filed in the United States District Court of the Northern District of California alleging that the Trump administration had overstepped its boundaries by authorizing funds to use to build the border wall without Congressional approval, citing the Congressional restrictions they had passed earlier in the month. One was filed by the state of California and 19 other states, while the other was filed by the American Civil Liberties Union for the Sierra Club and the Southern Border Communities Coalition. Both cases were heard together by Judge Haywood Gilliam.

On May 17, 2019, the U.S. Department of Justice argued in court that, because Congress had not explicitly stated in an appropriations bill that "no money shall be obligated" for construction of the wall, the administration was free to spend funds that were not expressly appropriated for border security. Douglas Letter, the general counsel for the House of Representatives, responded, "That just cannot be right. No money may be spent unless Congress actually appropriates it." On the following week, Gilliam granted a preliminary injunction preventing the Trump administration from redirecting funds under the national emergency declaration issued earlier in the year to fund a planned wall along the border with Mexico. Gilliam ruled that "Congress's 'absolute' control over federal expenditureseven when that control may frustrate the desires of the Executive Branch regarding initiatives it views as importantis not a bug in our constitutional system. It is a feature of that system, and an essential one." The injunction applied specifically to some of the money the administration intended to allocate from other agencies, and limited wall construction projects in El Paso, Texas and Yuma, Arizona. Gilliam's decision was temporarily upheld on appeal to the Ninth Circuit Court on July 3, 2019.

The U.S. Department of Justice petitioned the Supreme Court, and on July 26, 2019, the Supreme Court, in a 5–4 decision, issued a stay to Gilliam's ruling, allowing wall and related construction to proceed while litigation continues. The summary ruling from the majority indicated the groups suing the government may not have standing to challenge the executive order. However, the plaintiffs will return to the Ninth Circuit Appeals Court. Rulings for both the states' and the environmental groups' cases were issued on June 26, 2020, with the Ninth Circuit affirming that the funds for constructing the wall were transferred illegally against the Appropriations Clause.

The parties in the Sierra Club suit sought to have the Supreme Court lift their stay based on the Ninth's decision, but the Supreme Court refused to grant this on a 5–4 order on July 31, 2020, effectively allowing the wall construction to continue despite the decision of the Ninth; Justices Ginsburg, Breyer, Kagan, and Sotomayor dissented. On August 7, 2020, the U.S. Department of Justice petitioned the Supreme Court challenging the Ninth Circuit's ruling in both the California and Sierra Club cases on the questions of standing and the legality of the appropriations transfer. On October 19, 2020, the Supreme Court announced that it would hear the case.

The House of Representatives also filed suit in the U.S. District Court for the District of Columbia against the administration in 2019 for misappropriation of funds. U.S. District Judge Trevor N. McFadden dismissed the lawsuit in June 2019, determining the House could not show damages and thus had no standing to sue. On appeal, a unanimous panel of the U.S. Court of Appeals for the District of Columbia Circuit reversed, in September 2020, finding that expenditures made without the approval of the House of Representatives are an injury for which the House has standing to sue.

The case was made moot with the ceased construction and delegated to lower courts for any necessary further processing.

Environmental legal challenge
In April 2017, the Center for Biological Diversity, an environmental group, and U.S. Representative Raúl Grijalva from Arizona, the ranking Democratic member on the House Committee on Natural Resources filed a lawsuit in federal court in Tucson. In their complaint, Grijalva and the Center argue that the government's wall construction plans fail to comply with the National Environmental Policy Act, and seek to compel the government to carry out an environmental impact study and produce an environmental impact statement (EIS) before building the wall. The lawsuit specifically seeks "to stop any work until the government agrees to analyze the impact of construction, noise, light and other changes to the landscape on rivers, plants and endangered speciesincluding jaguars, Sonoran pronghorns and ocelotsand also on border residents". Two separate cases, also arguing about the government's failure to complete an EIS, were later filed, one by the groups the Sierra Club, Defenders of Wildlife and the Animal Legal Defense Fund, and the second by California's Attorney General Xavier Becerra.

The three lawsuits were consolidated into a single case within the U.S. District Court for the Southern District of California by Judge Gonzalo P. Curiel. Oral arguments were heard in February 2018, and Curiel ruled by the end of the month in favor of the government, citing that the Department of Homeland Security has several waivers in its authorization to expedite construction of border walls, which includes bypassing the EIS statement. Curiel had written his opinion without consideration of the other political issues regarding the border wall, ruling only on the environment impact aspect. The ruling was challenged to the U.S. Supreme Court by the Sierra Club, Defenders of Wildlife, and the Animal Legal Defense Fund, but the Court denied their petition for writ of certiorari by December 2018, allowing Curiel's decision to stand.

Eminent domain
About two-thirds of the U.S.–Mexico border runs along private or state-owned lands, and the federal government would need to acquire such land through purchase or seizure (eminent domain) to build any border wall. The "process is likely to cost the government millions and could take years of complex litigation", as was the case for pre-existing border walls. In his budget request to Congress, Trump requested funds for twenty U.S. Department of Justice lawyers "to pursue federal efforts to obtain the land and holdings necessary to secure the Southwest border". In 2017, he also revived condemnation litigation against land owners that had been dormant for years. By December 2019, the Trump administration had acquired three miles (4.8 km).

Religious freedom
The Roman Catholic Diocese of Brownsville has challenged the government's right to build part of the wall on the grounds of a historic chapel, La Lomita Chapel in Mission, Texas. At a hearing in McAllen, Texas, on February 6, 2019, U.S. District Judge Randy Crane said the diocese must allow surveyors onto the grounds. The diocese is hoping that, once the survey is completed, the government will reconsider. If not, the diocese plans to assert its rights under the Religious Freedom Restoration Act, a federal law which prohibits the government from placing a "substantial burden" on the practice of religion. According to Mary McCord, a Georgetown University ICAP attorney representing the diocese, "a physical barrier that cuts off access to the chapel, and not only to Father Roy and his parish but those who seek to worship there, is clearly a substantial burden on the exercise of religious freedom."

See also

 Berlin Wall
 Blake Marnell
 Border Control
 Brexit and the Irish border
 Canada–United States border
 E-Verify
 Great Wall of China
 Immigration reform in the United States
 India–Pakistan border
 Israeli West Bank barrier
 Operation Intercept
 Roosevelt Reservation
 Veracity of statements by Donald Trump

Notes

References

Further reading
 Chaichian, Mohammad. 2014. Empires and Walls: Globalization, Migration and Colonial Domination (Brill, pp. 175–245). .
 
 Shaw, Adam, "New acting DHS Chief Chad Wolf tours new border wall as construction ramps up, calls it 'common sense'", Fox News, November 23, 2019

2019 establishments in the United States
21st-century fortifications
Anti-immigration politics in the United States
Border barriers
Conservatism in the United States
Wall
Engineering projects
Immigration policy of Donald Trump
Mexico–United States barrier
Mexico–United States border
Proposed infrastructure in the United States
Trump administration controversies